St George's House, originally called the Northern Police Orphanage was an orphanage and children's home located on Otley Road, Harrogate, Yorkshire, England, founded by Catherine Gurney.

References
East, G.C.; A History of Policing in Harrogate & District, 1996
St George's House
St George's House, Annual Report 1948 - 1949

Buildings and structures in Harrogate
Orphanages in the United Kingdom
1898 establishments in England
1956 disestablishments in England